Joseph Chen (born 1952) is a Taiwanese politician. He was the Political Deputy Minister of Culture since February 2015 until May 2016.

Early life
Chen obtained his bachelor's degree in foreign language and literature from National Taiwan University.

See also
 Ministry of Culture (Taiwan)

References

1952 births
Living people
Taiwanese Ministers of Culture